Prairie Avenue Courts was a Chicago Housing Authority (CHA) public housing project in the South Commons neighborhood located on the south side of Chicago, Illinois, United States. First buildings completed in 1952, Prairie Avenue Courts consisted of two-story row-houses, seven and fourteen-story buildings. Prairie Avenue Courts were located to the south of McCormick Place and adjacent to Dunbar Park and Dunbar Vocational High School.

History
In January 1955, The Chicago Housing Authority approved construction on 6,000 public housing units; which included 200 units at Prairie Avenue Courts. In 1956, extension of the original buildings were constructed; completed in 1958. The 13–story building located at 2822 S. Prairie Avenue welcomed its first tenants, The Gleghorn's on August 31, 1958. Then–mayor Richard J. Daley presented the family with their key.

References

Residential buildings completed in 1952
Demolished buildings and structures in Chicago
Public housing in Chicago
Urban decay in the United States
Buildings and structures demolished in 2003